Argentinodictya is an extinct genus of bryozoans which existed in what is now Argentina during the Late Ordovician. It was described by Andrej Ernst and Marcelo Carrera in 2012, and the type and only species is Argentinodictya lenticulata.

References

Fossil taxa described in 2012
Ordovician bryozoans
Prehistoric bryozoan genera
Extinct bryozoans